The 1949 Cork Senior Football Championship was the 61st staging of the Cork Senior Football Championship since its establishment by the Cork County Board in 1887.

Millstreet entered the championship as the defending champions.

On 6 November 1949, Collins won the championship following a 5-11 to 0-01 defeat of Macroom in a replay of the final at the Cork Athletic Grounds. This was their second championship title overall and their first title since 1929.

Results

Final

Championship statistics

Miscellaneous
 Collins win their first title since 1929.

References

Cork Senior Football Championship